High-Rise is a studio album by American vocal duo Ashford & Simpson, released in 1983 on Capitol Records. It was their second album for Capitol.

Critical reception
The Virginia Pilot called High-Rise "a fine transitional record for the duo, where A&S added more dazzle and lights to their urbane sound without compromising its soulful essence."

Chart performance
The album peaked at No. 14 on the Billboard R&B albums chart and No. 84 on the Billboard top albums chart. Three singles were released. The album's title track peaked at No. 17 on the Hot Black Singles chart, "It's Much Deeper" and "I'm Not That Tough" charted 45 and 78 respectfully on the Hot Black Singles chart.

Track listing
All writing by Nickolas Ashford and Valerie Simpson
 "High-Rise"	5:35
 "Side Effect"	4:07
 "Experience (Love Had No Face)"	4:38
 "It's a Rush"	5:06
 "My Kinda Pick Me Up"	3:09
 "I'm Not That Tough"	4:34
 "It's Much Deeper"	6:30
 "Still Such a Thing"	5:13

Personnel
Nickolas Ashford - vocals
Valerie Simpson – vocals, acoustic piano
Sid McGinnis - guitar
Francisco Centeno - bass
Ray Chew - Yamaha electric piano, synthesizer, vibraphone
Ed Walsh, Peter Cannarozzi - synthesizer
Yogi Horton, Steve Gadd - drums
Errol "Crusher" Bennett, Ralph MacDonald - percussion
George Young, Sephra Herman - horns
Vivian Cherry, Ullanda McCullough - backing vocals
Alfred Brown - strings
Leon Pendarvis, Paul Riser - strings and horns arrangements

Charts

References

External links
 

1983 albums
Ashford & Simpson albums
Albums arranged by Paul Riser
Albums produced by Ashford & Simpson
Capitol Records albums